Dave Stapleton may refer to:
 David Stapleton (Lieutenant-General) Irish Defence Forces Chief of Staff 1998–2000
 Dave Stapleton (infielder) (born 1954), baseball player who played with the Boston Red Sox 1980–86
 Dave Stapleton (pitcher) (born 1961), baseball player who played with the Milwaukee Brewers 1987–88
Dave Stapleton (born 1979), pianist, composer and founder of Edition Records